The 2021 UAE Super Cup was the 14th professional and 20th overall UAE Super Cup, an annual football match played between the winners of the previous season's League and President's Cup. It was played between Al Jazira who won the league on the final day of the season and Shabab Al Ahli who defeated Al Nasr in the President's cup final. Al Jazira would win their first super cup title after beating Shabab Al Ahli 5–3 on penalty shootouts.

Details

References

External links

UAE Super Cup
Shabab Al-Ahli Dubai FC
UAE Super Cup seasons